Hosuseri is a god that appears in Japanese mythology. Second child of Ninigi-no-Mikoto and Konohanasakuya-hime. He is considered to be the great-uncle of Emperor Jimmu (the first Emperor of Japan).

Overview

The name Honosusori appears only in the Kojiki and not in the Nihon Shoki. The description in the "Kojiki" is only that he is the second child of Ninigi-no-Mikoto and Konohanasakuya-hime, and there is no description of the achievements.

According to the Kojiki: Ninigi and Konohanasakuya-hime had a brief sexual encounter, after which Konohanasakuya-hime became pregnant. However, Ninigi doubted whether she could conceive so quickly. Frustrated with Ninigi's suspicion, Sakuyahime built a long birthing hut and set it on fire. Amid the blaze, she gave birth to three male kami - Hoderi no mikoto (Umisachi), Hosuseri, and Hoori (Yamasachi) in that order.

Name meaning 
The prefix "ho" in their names can mean either "flame" or "heads of grain," while "suseri" is linked to "susumu" (to advance). Hence, their names signify the progression of flames or the steady growth of rice grain.

References

See Also 

 List of Japanese deities
 Tenson kōrin
Food deities
Japanese gods